François Neuville (24 November 1912, in Mons-Crotteux – 12 April 1986, in Dadizele) was a Belgian professional road bicycle racer. In 1938, Neuville won one stage of the 1938 Tour de France.

Major results

1934
Berlare
Waremme
1938
Tour of Belgium
Hollogne-aux-Pierres
Hologne
Tour de France:
Winner stage 20C
1942
Circuit de France
Antheit
1944
Verviers

External links 

Official Tour de France results for François Neuville

1912 births
1986 deaths
People from Flémalle
Belgian male cyclists
Belgian Tour de France stage winners
Cyclists from Liège Province